Della Prell Darknell Campbell (December 22, 1889 - died after 1971) was the Dean of girls at North Central High School, Spokane, Washington.

Early life
Della Prell was born on December 22, 1889, in Brandon, Wisconsin, the daughter of John and Augusta Prell.

She graduated from Washington State University in 1919 and was part of the Gamma Eta Chapter. She was present at the 50 years celebration of the Gamma Eta Chapter in Pullman, Washington in 1971.

Career
Della Prell Darknell was the Dean of girls at North Central High School (Spokane, Washington). 

She was active in field of Home Economics.

She was a member of Omicron Nu, American Association of University Women, White Cross, National Association of Administrative Women, National Education Association, Kappa Kappa Gamma. 

She retired in 1957 and moved to Long Beach, California.

Personal life
Della Prell Darknell moved to Washington in 1908, and lived at 1418 W. Riverside, Spokane, Washington.

On June 19, 1929, she married George O. Campbell, in Spokane, Washington, and after the wedding they moved to Big Timber, Montana.

References

1899 births
American educators
People from Brandon, Wisconsin
Year of death missing